Saint Paul Public Schools (SPPS) is a school district (ISD #625) that operates in Saint Paul, Minnesota.

Saint Paul Public Schools is Minnesota's largest school district and serves approximately 33,000 students.  The district runs 69 different schools including 37 elementary schools, 16 middle schools, 10 high schools, 2 alternative schools and 4 special education schools. The district employs around 6,500 teachers and staff. The entire school district participates in the University of Minnesota's College in the Schools (CIS) program.

St. Paul Public Schools oversees community education programs for pre-K and adult learners. The Community Education program includes classes and services such as Early Childhood Family Education, GED Diploma, language programs, and various other learning programs for community members of any age.

In 1993, St. Paul became the first city in the U.S. to sponsor and open a charter school, now found in most states across the nation. Saint Paul is currently home to 21 charter schools.

St. Paul Public Schools celebrated its 150th anniversary in 2006. Notable graduates of St. Paul Public Schools include former U.S. Supreme Court justices Harry Blackmun and Warren Burger, civil rights leader Roy Wilkins, creator of the Peanuts cartoon strip Charles M. Schulz, and many others from various professions and among notable achievements.

Demographics
The district has students from families speaking 114 different languages, although only four languages are used for most school communication. Those languages are English, Spanish, Hmong and Somali. 73.91% of students are students of color. 69% of the district's students qualify for free or reduced lunch, 17% of students are considered Special Education and 40% of students are ELL (English Language Learners). The school district currently receives $22 million a year in desegregation funding from the state. However, because of two United States Supreme Court cases, schools are no longer allowed to assign students to schools based on race.

As of 2001, the district had 46,000 students. Around one third of them were Hmong. At the time, about 13,000 of the Hmong students received English as a second language (ESL) services. In 2002, of all of the American school districts, St. Paul had the largest Hmong student population.

Governing body

The governing body of the school district is the seven-member Board of Education. The Board of Education then appoints a Superintendent who is responsible for the general supervision of the school district.

Board of Education is elected during Saint Paul's general municipal elections. Board members are elected every two years in odd-numbered years and serve staggered four-year terms. The school board elections are technically nonpartisan, however most candidates seek and advertise party endorsements.

The current Superintendent is Joe Gothard. 
The current Board of Education members are:
 Zuki Ellis(Chair)
 Steve Marchese (vice-chair)
 Jeanelle Foster (Clerk)
 Jon Schumacher (Treasurer)
 John Brodrick (Director)
 Mary Vanderwert (Director)
 (Vacant)

Elementary schools (PreK-5)

Middle schools (6-8)
Battle Creek Middle School
Capitol Hill Gifted and Talented Magnet (1-8)
Farnsworth Aerospace Magnet
Hazel Park Preparatory Academy
Highland Park Middle School
Humboldt Secondary School
Global Arts Plus Upper Campus
Murray Middle School
Parkway Montessori Community Middle School
Open World Expeditionary Secondary
Ramsey Middle School
Washington Technology Secondary
Creative Arts Secondary

High schools (9-12)
Arlington Senior High School (Closed after the 2010-2011 school year now part of Washington Technology Magnet School) 
Central Senior High School
Como Park Senior High School
Harding Senior High School
Highland Park Senior High School
Humboldt Senior High School
Johnson Senior High School
Open World Learning Community (6-12)
Creative Arts High School (9-12)
Washington Technology Magnet School (6-12)

History of Saint Paul Public Schools
In 1856, a small group of citizens decided that it was of vital importance to establish a school district the St. Paul. They did this as they believed "good schools would provide good settlers". Nine years previously, Harriet Bishop moved to the at the time small but growing city of St. Paul. She was part of a program led by educational reformer Catharine Beecher that was designed to help educate frontier children. As part of the program, she volunteered to teach the children of St. Paul. Harriet Bishop is credited with starting the first public school in the Saint Paul Public Schools district. 

In 1870, two students by the names of Fannie Hayes and A. P. Warren became the first two students to graduate from Saint Paul High School. Nine years later in 1879, Saint Paul High School was renamed to Central High School. Grover Cleveland High School was established in 1897; it was renamed to Johnson Senior High School in 1911. By 1906, the Saint Paul Public Schools district had around 27,940 students attending it. Eight years later in 1914, the Saint Paul city government took control of all educational matters. However, after 36 years of government control and extensive protesting from citizens, the Saint Paul Public Schools Board of Education was reinstated in 1950. 

In 1954, the US Supreme Court ruled that public education between minorities and the majority could not be equal if it remained "separated". A decade later in 1964, the Saint Paul Public Schools district addressed the issue of racial injustice and started developing solutions so that students would have equal access to education. 

On February 28, 2004, over 6,000 students, parents, and school staff rallied at the Capitol for the government to support more education funding.

Special programs

LEAP - International Academy 
In Fall of 1994, Saint Paul Public Schools started the Limited English Achievement Program (LEAP) as a school completely dedicated to English language learners (ELL) aged 16 to 24 years. In 2005, the school's name was changed to "International Academy - LEAP" to reflect a more direct meaning for the school. These are students whose needs often do not match the offerings provided in traditional high school.

See also

List of school districts in Minnesota
Saint Paul Public Schools' Official Website

References

External links
Saint Paul Public Schools official website

School districts in Minnesota
Education in Saint Paul, Minnesota
School districts established in 1856